Musa rubinea is a species of wild banana (genus Musa).

References

rubinea